General elections were held in Belgium on 10 December 1857, the first full general elections since 1848. The elections were called by royal order of 12 November 1857, dissolving the Chamber of Representatives that had convened in a new session only two days earlier.

Going into the elections, Liberals held a majority in the Senate and the Catholics in the Chamber of Representatives. The unionist (Catholic–liberal) De Decker government resigned and a liberal government led by Charles Rogier took over shortly before the elections were called.

In the elections for the Chamber of Representatives the result was a victory for the Liberal Party, which won 70 of the 108 seats. The Liberal Party now had a majority in both chambers of parliament.

Voter turnout was 79.3%, although only 90,543 men (2% of the country's population) were eligible to vote.

Campaign
Twelve of the 108 seats were uncontested, of which the Liberals won three and the Catholics nine.

Results

References

1850s elections in Belgium
General
Belgium
Belgium